Maitri Nicolai, known under her stage name Maitri is a Dutch musician.

Work
Maitri is best known as the bassist, song writer, and female vocalist of the gothic rock band Christian Death. She joined the band in 1991, taking to the stage for her first performance at the Contemporary Festival, held at the Anfitheatro delle Cascine in Florence, Italy, on 12 July 1991. Maitri made her studio debut on the compilation album Jesus Points the Bone at You, performing on the new version of the track "The Nascent Virion", recorded especially for that collection. Maitri is also the lead vocalist and song writer of the black metal band Lover of Sin.

References

Living people
Dutch women singers
Dutch heavy metal bass guitarists
Dutch heavy metal singers
Dutch expatriates in the United States
Women bass guitarists
Christian Death members
Musicians from Rotterdam
Year of birth missing (living people)